Lionville Historic District is a national historic district located in Uwchlan Township, Chester County, Pennsylvania, United States. The district includes 39 contributing buildings in the crossroads community of Lionville. The buildings date to the 18th and 19th century and include a variety of residential, commercial, and institutional buildings and outbuildings.  Notable buildings include the Cadwalader House, Vaughan House, Red Lion Tavern (1740, 1815), Uwchlan Meeting House (1756), Wagonseller House, John Biedler Jr. Farmhouse (1811-1813), St. Paul's Parsonage (1813), Lionville Fire Company (1911), Joel Hawley Store (1834), Edith P. Moore School House, and former St. Paul's Lutheran Church (now known as The Nurtury).

David Lloyd was the first to sell large and small lots in the area. A Welshman and friend of William Penn, Lloyd came from Welsh Pool, and the town took that name, although a pool was never in what is now Lionville. As travelers began using the roads in Chester County, many inns were built. One was the Red Lyon Inn, identifiable in the village by its colorful sign for the many people who could not read. First a log cabin, it was rebuilt in 1725 of red brick and offered respite to drovers until 1888. While men slept in the house, cattle bedded down in lots next to the inn. 

Red Lyon also became the village name until 1826 when the post office opened. However, since several Red Lyons were in Pennsylvania, the village became Lionville. Post offices at the time were in the postmaster's private home and moved as different people became postmaster. Mail arrived once a week by horseback and later several times a week by stagecoach. 

John Vickers' homestead, northeast on Welsh Pool Road, is a notable village landmark. In 1822 the family began making pottery, using skills learned from their grandfather and father. Martha, sister of John, was the most famous potter. She married William Milhous in 1807, moved to Ohio, and became the great, great grandparent of Hannah Milhous Nixon, mother of President Richard Nixon. 

John Vicker was better known as an abolitionist and an active member of the Underground Railroad. His father, Thomas, was an original member of the Pennsylvania Anti-Slavery Society, formed in Philadelphia in 1777 with Benjamin Franklin as its first president.

Lionville was added to the National Register of Historic Places in 1980.

References

Historic districts on the National Register of Historic Places in Pennsylvania
Italianate architecture in Pennsylvania
Neoclassical architecture in Pennsylvania
Historic districts in Chester County, Pennsylvania
National Register of Historic Places in Chester County, Pennsylvania